The Samsung Galaxy Xcover 3 is an Android smartphone produced by Samsung Electronics and released in July 2014. It is the successor to the Samsung Galaxy Xcover 2. The Xcover 3 is waterproof and dustproof designed around the IP67 specifications. Its successor is the Samsung Galaxy Xcover 4.

See also 
Samsung Galaxy S6 Active
 Samsung Rugby Smart

References

External links 
 Samsung Galaxy Xcover 3 Review

Android (operating system) devices
Samsung mobile phones
Samsung Galaxy
Samsung smartphones
Mobile phones introduced in 2015
Mobile phones with user-replaceable battery